Shahidul is a Bengali Muslim given name. It may refer to:
Shahidul Islam (disambiguation), list of people with the name
Shahidul Zahir, late Bangladeshi writer
Shahidul Alam (disambiguation), list of people with that name
AKM Shahidul Haque, current inspector general of Bangladesh police